Gasan Jitō was a Zen master in the Japanese Rinzai school. He received Dharma transmission from Rinzai teacher Gessen Zen'e, before meeting Hakuin. Deeply impressed, he started koan-study with Hakuin, completing it under Tōrei Enji tutelage. Gasan is considered to be a dharma heir of Hakuin, though "he did not belong to the close circle of disciples and was probably not even one of Hakuin's dharma heirs," After receiving dharma transmission, Gasan Jitō moved to Rinsho-in, a temple in Edo. His two most important students, Inzan ien and Takuju Kosen, completed the formalisation of the Rinzai koan-curriculum.

Notes

References

Sources

 

 

 

Japanese Zen Buddhists
Zen Buddhist spiritual teachers
Year of birth missing
Rinzai Buddhists